Arturo Avilés Salazar (born June 23, 1994, in Mexico City) is a Mexican professional footballer who plays for Yalmakán F.C. on loan from Atlante of Ascenso MX.

Personal life
Avilés' father, also named Arturo, is a football manager and former footballer.

References

External links
 
 
 Arturo Avilés Salazar at Atlante F.C. Profile

1994 births
Living people
Association football defenders
Atlante F.C. footballers
Yalmakán F.C. footballers
Cocodrilos de Tabasco footballers
Ascenso MX players
Liga Premier de México players
Tercera División de México players
Footballers from Mexico City
Mexican footballers